Seán Collins (10 July 1918 – 11 April 1975) was an Irish Fine Gael politician. A barrister, Collins was elected to Dáil Éireann as a Fine Gael Teachta Dála (TD) for the Cork West constituency at the 1948 general election, and retained his seat in each election until losing it at the 1957 general election. Collins was re-elected for the Cork South-West constituency at the 1961 general election and held his seat until again losing it at the 1969 general election, and did not stand for election again. He was a nephew of the Irish political leader Michael Collins.

References

1918 births
1975 deaths
Fine Gael TDs
Members of the 13th Dáil
Members of the 14th Dáil
Members of the 15th Dáil
Members of the 17th Dáil
Members of the 18th Dáil
Irish barristers
Politicians from County Cork